Béla Csongor Fejér (born 11 May 1995) is a Romanian professional footballer who plays as a goalkeeper for Nemzeti Bajnokság II club Nyíregyháza Spartacus.

International career
At youth level he made one appearance for Romania under-19 in 2014.

In 2018 he was member of the Kárpátalja squad that won the 2018 ConIFA World Football Cup. He saved three penalties in the final shoot-out against Northern Cyprus. For his numerous impressive stints in goals he has been named the Player of the Tournament.

Honours

Club

ASA Târgu Mureș
 Supercupa României: 2015

International

Kárpátalja
 ConIFA World Football Cup: 2018

Individual
 ConIFA World Football Cup Player of the Tournament: 2018

References

External links
 
 

1995 births
People from Covasna County
Living people
Romanian sportspeople of Hungarian descent
Romanian footballers
Association football goalkeepers
Liga II players
SCM Râmnicu Vâlcea players
Liga I players
ASA 2013 Târgu Mureș players
Sepsi OSK Sfântu Gheorghe players
Nemzeti Bajnokság II players
Nyíregyháza Spartacus FC players